The former Van Nelle Factory on the Schie in Rotterdam, is considered a prime example of the International Style based upon constructivist architecture. It has been a designated UNESCO World Heritage Site since 2014. Soon after it was built, prominent architects described the factory as "the most beautiful spectacle of the modern age" (Le Corbusier in 1932) and "a poem in steel and glass" (Robertson  in 1930).

History
The buildings were designed by architect Leendert van der Vlugt from the Brinkman & Van der Vlugt office in cooperation with civil engineer J.G. Wiebenga, at that time a specialist for constructions in reinforced concrete, and built between 1925 and 1931. It is an example of Nieuwe Bouwen, modern architecture in the Netherlands. It was commissioned by the co-owner of the Van Nelle company, Cees van der Leeuw, on behalf of the owners. Van der Leeuw and both company-directors, Matthijs de Bruyn and Bertus Sonneveld, were so impressed by the skills of Van der Vlugt they commissioned him to design and build private houses for themselves in Rotterdam and nearby Schiedam between 1928 and 1932. The fully renovated Sonneveld House is now a museum in the center of Rotterdam, with more than 30,000 annual visitors from all over the world.

In the 20th century it was a factory, processing coffee, tea and tobacco and later on additional chewing gum, cigarettes, instant pudding and rice. The operation stopped in 1996. Initially after the renovation it was known as the Van Nelle Design Factory ("Van Nelle Ontwerpfabriek" in Dutch). More recently, the narrow focus on tenants in the design and architecture sectors has been abandoned and currently the building houses a wide variety of companies and a modern co-working space. Some of the areas are used for meetings, conventions and events.

Eric Gude, a Dutch specialist in the conversion of former industrial sites, planned and organized this change of use for the Van Nelle factory in 1997 and introduced Wessel de Jonge, an authority on the renovation of modern architecture in 1999, to coordinate the overall renovation, which began in the year 2000.

In 2015, the Van Nelle Factory topped the list of The 25 Most Beautiful Factories in the World.

Architecture
The Van Nelle Factory shows the influence of Russian Constructivism. Mart Stam, who worked during 1926 as employee-designer at the Brinkman & Van der Vlugt office in Rotterdam, came in contact with the Russian Avant-Garde in 1922 in Berlin. In 1926 Mart Stam organized an architecture tour of the Netherlands for the Russian artist El Lissitzky and his wife Sophie Küppers, collector of avant-garde art. They visited Jacobus Oud, Cornelis van Eesteren, Gerrit Rietveld, and other artists. Sophie Küppers stated that Mart Stam spoke about 'his' factory during that trip. That happened to be the immediate cause for his dismissal.

It is claimed that the building featured the first industrially prefabricated curtain wall in the world.

National monument
The Van Nelle Factory is a Dutch national monument (Rijksmonument) and since 2014 has the status of UNESCO World Heritage Site. The Justification of Outstanding Universal Value was presented in 2013 to the UNESCO World Heritage Committee.

References

External links

Company Website
UNESCO listing

Industrial buildings completed in 1931
Buildings and structures in Rotterdam
Rijksmonuments in Rotterdam
Modernist architecture in the Netherlands
World Heritage Sites in the Netherlands